Lois J. Surgenor is a New Zealand clinical psychologist and academic. Her research focuses on eating disorders and traumatic brain injury. As of 2021 she is a full professor at the University of Otago.

Academic career

Surgenor has a MA and diploma of clinical psychology from the University of Canterbury. She has practised as a registered clinical psychologist since the late 1980s. She joined the University of Otago in 1996 and in 2002 she completed a PhD at Otago. She was promoted to full professor with effect from 1 February 2019.

Selected works

References

External links
 "Journeys through eating disorders" – Surgenor's Inaugural Professorial Lecture, 25 September 2019

Living people
Year of birth missing (living people)
New Zealand women academics
New Zealand women psychologists

New Zealand psychologists
University of Canterbury alumni
University of Otago alumni
Academic staff of the University of Otago